Delta Lake may refer to:

 Delta Lake (Software), an open-source storage framework that enables building a lakehouse architecture on huge volumes of data for any use case
Delta Lake (Teton County, Wyoming) in Grand Teton National Park
Delta Reservoir, a reservoir in New York also known as Delta Lake
Delta Lake State Park in New York